Stanley Elbers (born 14 May 1992) is a Dutch footballer who plays as a winger.

Club career
Elbers made his professional for ADO Den Haag on 28 August 2011 and joined Helmond Sport in summer 2013. He signed a three-year contract with Excelsior in 2015.

On 14 August 2018, he joined PEC Zwolle on a two-year contract.

Personal life
Born in the Netherlands, Elbers is of Surinamese descent.

References

External links
 
 Voetbal International profile 

1992 births
Living people
People from Wassenaar
Dutch footballers
Dutch sportspeople of Surinamese descent
Association football wingers
ADO Den Haag players
Helmond Sport players
Excelsior Rotterdam players
PEC Zwolle players
RKC Waalwijk players
Eredivisie players
Eerste Divisie players
FC Hermannstadt players
Liga I players
Liga II players
Dutch expatriate footballers
Dutch expatriate sportspeople in Romania
Expatriate footballers in Romania
Footballers from South Holland
21st-century Dutch people